The National Collegiate Athletic Association General Championship is awarded to the school with the most points garnered in an academic year in the NCAA. It is split into the Juniors' division (for male high school students) and to the Seniors' division (for college students).

The champion school in a given sport receives 30 points, with the runner-up receiving 20, and the last place receiving one point. All of the points from the different sports are then tabulated, and the school with the most points is the General Champion. Only sports that are official are included (cheerleading is excluded).

The awarded school is judged as the best athletic program in the NCAA for the given academic year.

The General Championship is similar to the NACDA Director's Cup of the American NCAA.

Points distribution

General champions

Early years
The NCAA was founded by Ateneo, La Salle, FEU, NU, San Beda, UM, UP and UST in 1924. Only in 1960 the NCAA started the general championship race during the time of Ateneo, Letran, La Salle, JRC, Mapúa and San Beda also known as the old-timer six.

First expansion
San Sebastian was added. Trinity was also added as a full member in 1974; it left the league in 1986.

First contraction
Ateneo left in 1978 followed by La Salle in 1980.

Second expansion
Perpetual Help College of Rizal was added in 1984, the same year San Beda left which rejoined in 1986.

Third expansion

In 1996, PCU became a member and followed by CSB in 1998. PCU was suspended in 2007 and had an indefinite leave in 2009.

Note:
*In the 2005-06 season, San Sebastian College - Recoletos had more championships (4) than La Salle Green Hills (3), San Sebastian won the General Championship, despite being tied for first place.

Fourth expansion
In 2009, AUF, Arellano and EAC were added as guest members. Only Arellano and EAC were accepted as probationary members. Lyceum was added as a guest member in 2011. In 2013, Arellano was granted full membership, followed by EAC and Lyceum in 2015.

Number of general championships by school

NOTE
 LSGH, an NCAA juniors team, won eight (8) general championships as the DLSU juniors team and four (4) as the CSB juniors team.

Total NCAA Championships per school
Demonstration sports are not included.

Notes
a.LSGH, a juniors team, has been playing in the NCAA as a junior to both DLSU and CSB, but has never been directly under either institution.
b.The Mapúa High School was closed down in 2005. Since 2008, the Malayan High School of Science Red Robins represented Mapúa University in the juniors' division.

References
 Champions list at the NCAA Philippines official website
 Champions list at Web Archive

See also
UAAP Overall Championship

General Championship